Black Guns Matter is an organization aimed at educating African Americans about gun culture in the United States, primarily around defending Second Amendment rights. The organization is led by Maj Toure, who founded it in 2016. Black Guns Matter has hosted workshops in multiple cities to teach the basics of firearm safety, U.S. gun laws, and conflict resolution.

Background 

While African Americans predominantly support gun control, the 2016 election of former U.S. president Donald Trump sparked a wave of interest in firearm ownership. In this time, the National African American Gun Association saw a tripled increase in membership, attributed to a fear of heightened racial tensions and a perceived need for self defense. While still less likely to be gun owners than white Americans, interest in firearms among African Americans grew again in 2020 in the wake of the COVID-19 pandemic, the George Floyd protests, Black Lives Matter, and renewed concerns around police brutality in the United States.

In 2016, Toure founded Black Guns Matter to prevent people from being arrested on what he believed to be avoidable gun possession charges due to a lack of knowledge on how to legally purchase and carry firearms; The organization takes its name from the Black Lives Matter social movement, both sharing similar criticism of police brutality. Toure has accused the Black Lives Matter Global Network Foundation of being a "sham organization" and a "money-laundering scheme" for the Democratic Party, and argued that it lacked financial transparency.

Views 
In September 2019, Toure testified, representing Black Guns Matter before the U.S. House of Representatives, for a hearing on urban gun violence to argue that educating citizens on conflict resolution is more effective than gun control. The organization attributes the high homicide rates in inner cities to a failure to de-escalate from violence and a lack of gun safety. Toure said that "more Black people would be alive if they were armed". He also argued that rates of police brutality may decrease when Black men carrying firearms are viewed as less of a threat by police.

Toure argued that safety means armed self-defense and "all gun control is racist", pointing to the 1967 Mulford Act signed by then-California governor Ronald Reagan that banned open-carry in the state in reaction to the weaponized Black Panther Party. Toure ran for a Philadelphia city council seat as a member of the Libertarian Party and spoke about Second Amendment rights at events with conservative lawmakers; he said that he was both using the conservative movement and being used by it. In 2019, Toure cancelled his membership of the National Rifle Association of America (NRA), saying that it was not doing enough for Black communities. In 2021, Toure took part at the Conservative Political Action Conference.

See also 
 Black conservatism in the United States
 Gun politics in the United States
 Liberal Gun Club
 Huey P. Newton Gun Club
 National African American Gun Association

References 

2016 establishments in Pennsylvania
African Americans' rights organizations
Black conservatism in the United States
Conservative political advocacy groups in the United States
Gun rights advocacy groups in the United States